Phewa Lake, Phewa Tal or Fewa Lake is a freshwater lake in Nepal formerly called Baidam Tal located in the south of the Pokhara Valley that includes Pokhara city; parts of Sarangkot and Kaskikot. The lake is stream-fed but a dam regulates the water reserves, therefore, the lake is classified as semi-natural freshwater lake. It is the second largest lake in Nepal; the largest in Gandaki Province after the Rara lake in the comparison to Nepal's water bodies. It is the most popular and most visited lake of Nepal. The Annapurna range on the north is only about 28 km (linear distance) away from the lake. The lake is also famous for the reflection of mount Machhapuchhre and other mountain peaks of the Annapurna and Dhaulagiri ranges on its surface. The Tal Barahi Temple is situated on an island in the lake. It is located 4 km from the city's centre Chipledhunga.

Origin 
An analysis of lake sediments reveals its age to be BC 12640 - 12025. However Phewa lake is regarded to be formed during circa 13000 BC.

Lake economy
Phewa lake and water sports is one of the major tourist attraction of Pokhara city and the north shore of the lake has developed into a tourist district, commonly called Lakeside, with hotels, restaurants and bars catering to the tourists. The water from Phewa lake's outlet is used to generate electricity. A part of the lake is also used as commercial caged fisheries.

Major Attraction
 Tal Barahi Temple, located at the center of Phewa Lake, is the most important religious monument of Pokhara.This two-storied pagoda is believed to be dedicated to one of the Hindu gods known as Vishnu. It usually gets crowded on Saturdays.
 Baidam is the eastern banks of Phewa lake also known as Lakeside. This part contains seemingly endless strip of hotels, lodges, restaurants, bookshops and souvenir shops. This side is one of the best known tourist area of Nepal. It is also the starting point of the tour to Pokhara.
 Sarangkot and paragliding, Sarangkot is the only one place in Nepal for paragliding, from where you can fly over the Fewa lake.
 Ratna Mandir, former palace used by the Nepalese royal family.

Gallery

See also
Annapurna
Dhaulagiri
Begnas Lake
Rara Lake
List of Nepal-related topics

References

External links

Phewa Lake Environment Awareness and Capacity Building Project
Pokhara Photo Gallery
Phewa Lake, photostory
Phewa Lake View

Lakes of Gandaki Province
Tourism in Nepal
Geography of Pokhara
Lakes of Nepal